The Lockers (originally named The Campbell Lockers) was a dance group formed by Toni Basil and Don "Campbellock" Campbell in 1971. Active throughout the 1970s, they were pioneers of street dance. Don Campbell is the founder of the locking dance style, and originally, Locking was called The Campbellock—a style that was based on the dance and song that Don Campbell created. Toni Basil met Campbell at a club in 1971 and together they formed The Lockers as a dance group. Toni Basil, who became Campbell's girlfriend, also served as The Lockers' manager, and was responsible for staging the act. All the dancers contributed steps and choreography with their unique and individual styles. By 1975 they were "Dancing their way to stardom" on their own.  Individual members' contributions (as soloist performers) to the dance style and group image coupled with their unique presentation in staging and concept broke down many barriers.  It has been said on the reality dance competition So You Think You Can Dance that "The Lockers' emergence on the dance scene changed the face of dance not only for street dancers but for dance in general and has made street dance a true American art form."

Performances
The Lockers' many television appearances include Saturday Night Live, Soul Train, Carol Burnett, The Tonight Show Starring Johnny Carson, the ABC sitcom What's Happening!! and The Midnight Special (Ohio Players performance). They have performed live on stage at Radio City Music Hall, Carnegie Hall, Disneyland, The MGM Grand Las Vegas, Harrah's Reno, and Harrah's Lake Tahoe. The group was animated for their appearance in the 1982 film Hey Good Lookin' directed by Ralph Bakshi. They appeared in commercials for Schlitz Malt Liquor and Billy Preston's "Nothing From Nothing".

Members

1973–1976 lineup
Don "Campbellock" Campbell (1951–2020), founding member
Toni Basil (born 1943), founding member
Fred Berry (1951–2003), founding member 
Greg "Campbellock Jr" Pope (1952–2010)
Adolfo "Shabba Doo" Quiñones (1955–2020), founding member
Bill "Slim the Robot" Williams (born 1952), founding member
Leo "Fluky Luke" Williamson, founding member
Anthony "Tony Go Go" Foster (born 1955)
Alpha Omega Anderson 

In 1976, Berry and Basil left the group amicably. The group has employed actor Mykelti Williamson (born 1957) as an alternate member.

Post-Lockers
After The Lockers disbanded, group members continued to find success individually. Both Don Campbell and Toni Basil have received the "Living Legend of Hip Hop" award from Hip Hop International.

Basil, who already had a successful career as a choreographer and actress prior to the Lockers, would go on to achieve pop music success with the Grammy nominated single "Mickey."

Adolfo Quinones starred as Ozone in the street dance films, Breakin' and Breakin' 2: Electric Boogaloo. He also did the choreography for Madonna's "Who's That Girl" tour. His awards include the "Lifetime Achievement Award" for outstanding contributions to hip-hop from The Carnival: Choreographer's Ball and the Drama Critic's Circle Award for Best Choreography for the musical Standup Tragedy.

Fred Berry would later find greater fame in the role of "Rerun" on the ABC sitcom What's Happening!! One episode would feature a performance by The Lockers (except for Toni Basil).  Berry also makes a cameo appearance in Toni Basil's "Shoppin' from A to Z" video.

 Leo "Fluky Luke" Williamson was attending classes with Ultimate Medical Academy, Tampa, Florida.

Notes and references

 Fred Berry died October 21, 2003.
Greg "Campbellock Jr" Pope died January 28, 2010.
Don "Campbellock" Campbell died March 30,220.
Adolfo ""Shabba-Doo" Quiñones died December 30, 2020

External links
 The Official Lockers website
 The Official Shabba-Doo website

Dance companies